Bathyspondylus is an extinct genus of plesiosaur from the Kimmeridge Clay Formation of Swindon, England. Because it is known only from its fossil vertebrae (and so few of those have been recovered), paleontologists are  not entirely sure of the taxonomy of Bathyspondylus; the family it belongs to is not currently known. The type, and only known, species is B. swindoniensis, which was described from the same material as its genus.

Etymology
The genus name Bathyspondylus is a compound of two Greek roots: βαθυς (bathys) 'deep' and σπονδυλος (spondylos) 'vertebra'. It can thus be translated as "deep-vertebrae".

The species name B. swindoniensis refers to the town of Swindon in Wiltshire, near which the holotype specimen was discovered.

Discovery and naming
The holotype, a set of ?21+ cervical vertebrae, was discovered in Late Jurassic (Kimmeridgian)-aged Kimmeridge Clay Formation, outcropping at the Great Western Railway Works in Swindon, England, in 1774 and the holotype was at one point in time part of the collection of William Cunnington III sometime before his death in 1810. It was probably part of the Devizes Museum collection by 1888, where it is now housed. It was named in 1982 by J. B. Delair.

Description
Bathyspondylus had centra set fairly deep in the vertebrae relative to its length, as its name (the Greek words for deep-vertebrae) would suggest. The vertebrae themselves are short antero-posteriorly and can be flat or concave on their terminal faces. The holotype specimen, from 1774, appears to have features of both pliosauroids and plesiosauroids incorporated into its bones.

Distribution

Bathyspondylus lived during the Kimmeridgian faunal stage of the Jurassic period, which occurred roughly 155 to 150 million years ago. The first of its fossils came from deposits near Swindon in Wiltshire, England.

See also
 Timeline of plesiosaur research
 List of plesiosaur genera

References

External links
https://web.archive.org/web/20071210085607/http://www.plesiosaur.com/database/genusIndividual.php?i=65
https://web.archive.org/web/20091001060613/http://www.dinosauria.com/dml/names/ples.html

Late Jurassic plesiosaurs of Europe
Plesiosauria incertae sedis
Fossil taxa described in 1982
Sauropterygian genera